Sienna is a clay used in making pigments, and a color.

Sienna may also refer to:

Businesses and organizations
 Sienna Senior Living, a Canadian senior housing company

Places

Italy
 Sienna, an alternative spelling of Siena, a city historically notable for production of the pigment and the origin of the name

Poland
 Sienna, Lesser Poland Voivodeship
 Sienna, Lower Silesian Voivodeship
 Sienna, Silesian Voivodeship
 Sienna Street, Kraków

United States
 Sienna, Texas

People
 Sienna (given name)
 Sienna (wrestler), the ring name of Allysin Kay (born 1987), an American professional wrestler
 Pedro Sienna (1893-1972), Chilean writer and actor
 Brent Sienna, a character in PvP
 Noam Sienna, author and Jewish educator

Other
 Sienna (album), a 1989 album by keyboardist Stanley Cowell
 Toyota Sienna, a minivan
 Sienna, a style of handbag sold by Kooba

See also
 Siena (disambiguation)